Staromuynakovo (Qart Muynaq) is a rural locality (a village) in Tungatarovsky Selsoviet, Uchalinsky District, Bashkortostan, Russia. The population was 237 as of 2010. There are 4 streets.

Geography 
Staromuynakovo is located 39 km northeast of Uchaly (the district's administrative centre) by road. Tungatarovo is the nearest rural locality.

References 

Rural localities in Uchalinsky District